Simba Queens is a Tanzanian professional women's football club based in Kariakoo, Dar es Salaam, Tanzania. The club features in the Tanzanian Women's Premier League. The club is affiliated to Simba SC who play in the Ligi Kuu Bara.

Players

Current squad

Champions League 2022 
The team won the 2022 Women's CECAFA championship trophy by defeating She Corporate FC of Uganda 1-0 in a match which took place at Azam Stadium on August 27, 2022. Simba next proceed to the CAF Women's Championship in Morocco in November, 2022.

References

External links 

 Official Website
 

Simba S.C.
Women's football clubs in Tanzania